Paulo Rogério Amoretty Souza (December 19, 1945 in Recife – Sao Paulo July 17, 2007) was a Brazilian lawyer and former chairman of the association football team Sport Club Internacional. He was born in Recife. Prior to his death he was an attorney for Sport Club Corinthians Paulista. He was married and had two sons, both of whom are lawyers.

Amoretty died as a result of the TAM Airlines Flight 3054 crash.

References

1945 births
2007 deaths
People from Rio Grande do Sul
Brazilian football chairmen and investors
Sport Club Internacional presidents
TAM Airlines Flight 3054 victims
20th-century  Brazilian lawyers